National Convention Center or National Convention Centre may refer to:

 Jinnah Convention Centre, Pakistan
 Olympic Green Convention Center, Beijing
 National Convention Centre Canberra, Australia
 Gaylord National Convention Center
 Queen Sirikit National Convention Center
 Vietnam National Convention Center
 Convention Centre Dublin